Phlojodicarpus is a genus of flowering plants belonging to the family Apiaceae.

Its native range is Central Asia to Russian Far East and Northern China.

Species
Species:

Phlojodicarpus komarovii 
Phlojodicarpus sibiricus 
Phlojodicarpus villosus

References

Apioideae
Apioideae genera